Gharib  Nawaz (غريب نواز) is the name of:

Moinuddin Chishti (1141-1230), the most famous Sufi saint of the Chishti Order of the Indian Subcontinent.
Gharib Nawaz (Manipur), name taken  by king Pamheiba of Manipur (1690–1751) following his conversion to Hinduism in 1717.

See also
Gharib (disambiguation)
Nawaz
Gharib Nawaz Mosque in Mominpura, Nagpur.
Khwaja Gharib Nawaz